Uciechów  is a village in the administrative district of Gmina Odolanów, within Ostrów Wielkopolski County, Greater Poland Voivodeship, in west-central Poland.

The village has an approximate population of 1,025.

References

Villages in Ostrów Wielkopolski County